The Staffin Bay Formation is a geologic formation in Scotland. It preserves fossils dating back to the 
Callovian of the Middle Jurassic. It consists of two members, the lower Upper Ostrea Member, which consists of dark grey, fissile mudstone with a shelly limestone bed, and laminated and rippled sandstones. While the upper Belemnite Sands Member consists of medium-grained calcareous sandstones and siltstones

See also

 List of fossiliferous stratigraphic units in Scotland

References
 

Jurassic Scotland